Hypolimnas antevorta is a butterfly in the family Nymphalidae. It is found in north-eastern Tanzania.

The larvae feed on Urera species, including U. hypselodendron.

References

Endemic fauna of Tanzania
Butterflies described in 1880
antevorta
Butterflies of Africa
Taxa named by William Lucas Distant